Kahl am Main (officially Kahl a. Main) is a community in the Aschaffenburg district in the Regierungsbezirk of Lower Franconia (Unterfranken) in Bavaria, Germany. It has around 7,500 inhabitants.

Geography

Location 

Kahl am Main lies 107 m above sea level and includes, at the mouth of the river Kahl, the lowest-lying point in the state of Bavaria and covers an area of approximately 11 km2. It also lies right on the boundary with Hesse in a favourable location with regards to transport between Aschaffenburg and Hanau (Main-Kinzig-Kreis).

Demographics
Kahl has a rate of population growth between −0.1% and 0.1%. It also has an aging population with the largest age group being 65 and above in 2014. The average age has increased from 46 in 2005 to 47.5 in 2014. Even though there have been fewer births than deaths consistently since 1975, the city has experiences slight growth due to newcomers.

Governance

Community council 

The council is made up of 21 council members, counting the mayor.

(as at municipal election held on 2 March 2008)

Coat of arms 
The community's arms might be described thus: Party per bend sinister wavy, the parting surmounted by a bend sinister wavy argent, azure a coney courant of the first in bend sinister, gules a demi-wheel spoked of six of the first couped in bend sinister.

The community of Kahl lies on a bend in the river Main, and this is referenced by the bend sinister wavy (slanted wavy stripe) in the arms. This also refers to the river Kahl, which is part of the community's name. The tinctures argent and gules (silver and red) and the half-wheel refer to Electoral Mainz's former overlordship in the community. The silver hare recalls the Kahl dwellers’ nickname Sandhasen (“Sand Hares”) – sometimes also Sandbauern (“Sand Farmers”) – arising from the community's lower crop yields than in other Main communities due to the sandy soil. Since 1806 the place has belonged to Bavaria, which is reflected in the tinctures argent and azure (blue).

The arms have been borne since 19 July 1960.

Town twinning
 Villefontaine, Isère, France since 1981
 Budakalász, Pest County, Hungary since 1998
 St. Ingbert-Rohrbach, Saarland, Germany 1968–1970
 Leutasch, Tyrol, Austria

The latter relationship is a "town friendship".

Economy
Within Kahl's municipal limits, roughly 350 businesses have their seats, among them Kopp (500 employees), Linde Material Handling GmbH (550 employees) and Singulus Technologies (350 employees), three big companies in engine building and electronics. Business taxes from all businesses lie between €3,300,000 and €9,100,000 each year.

Culture and sightseeing

Clubs 
Clubs include the Feuerwehr FF-Kahl (fire brigade) and the Rotes Kreuz Kahl. There was an umbrella group, the Vereinsgemeinschaft Kahl (“Kahl Club Community”), to which many of the local clubs belonged, and which, among other things, staged the yearly Kerb. Even though the community dissolved in 2016, the Kerb has been taken up by several other communities and is now organized by volunteers.

Buildings 

Baroque Schloss Emmerichshofen, built in 1768 by Baron von Bentzel-Sternau.
Saint Margaret's Catholic parish church (Katholische Pfarrkirche Sankt Margareta) in Baroque Revival style, made of red quarried Buntsandstein. A church was first mentioned at this site in 1330.
Evangelical Cross Church (Evangelische Kreuzkirche) in Bauhaus style.
Town hall: former customs house, built in 1830 in Neoclassical style, after 1834 a match and cigarette factory, after that an inn, weather station and school, since 1939 the community administration's seat.
Watertower, built in 1931.
Bakehouse (Backes): public oven, in which until 1938 bread was baked for almost 300 years. Today it is one of the oldest constructions of the city.
Timber-frame house (former estate), known to have stood before the Thirty Years' War; later a house and an inn; damaged by improper drain restoration.
Sand Hare Monument (Sandhasendenkmal): Kahl landmark of the former sand quarrying in the region, built in 1952 by Hermann Kröckel. The sand hare is also a charge in the community's arms.
Mills on the Kahl: Once, eleven mills were running on the lower three kilometres of the Kahlgrund upstream from where the Kahl empties into the Main. The first was mentioned in 1358. Ground were grain, mustard seed and oilseed. “Sand mills” played a rôle beginning about 1900. In one of the fulling mills with 15 workers, Nikolaus Wahl brought the world's first automatic feltmaking machine into service in 1904. At the beginning of the 21st century, only a few mills bear witness to that time, and some have been converted to houses: Obere Fallersmühle, Untere Fallersmühle (rolling mill), Schäfereimühle, Lohmühle, Nassmühle. Since the millers often backed the water up too high, there were time and again floods. In particular, the Nassmühle (literally, “Wet Mill”) came to grief one day in the late 16th century when local farmers, angered at having their harvest wiped out by flooding, stormed the mill on 2 June 1573 and destroyed it. A hiking path with documentary plaques follows the historic mill route.

Parks 
The Vogelpark Kahl ("bird park") was founded in 1971 and was a three-hectare non-profit aviary and open-air complex for domestic and exotic birds. On 30 June 2006, the bird park was closed on consideration of the bird flu regulations, such as those requiring confinement.

Nature 

The local scenery is characterized by forest and water, which make up 75% of the municipal area. The quarry lakes of the Kahl Lake Plateau (Kahler Seenplatte) with outdoor bathing at Waldseebad (former Emma-Nord stripmine) and Campingsee (Freigericht-Ost) with one of Bavaria's biggest campsites as well as the angling ponds of the former Emma-Süd pit and the Vorspessartseen (lakes) offer opportunities for angling, boating, swimming and surfing. Five hiking trails and a fitness course (Vitaparcours) lead through the Kahl nature areas with their typical vegetation and sand flora. Many wild herbs, hogweed, wild carrot and malva grow in the meadows alongside the Main, where there is also a small campsite.

The natural monument Hexeneiche (“Witches’ Oak”) on the B 8 was destroyed on 7 August 1970 by a lightning strike. The oak, known to have already been standing in the Thirty Years' War, had to be felled on 8 June 1971. A newly planted oak and a memorial stone recall the witchhunts in the early 17th century, to which 69 women and 21 men fell victim here.

On holidays, the railway line between Kahl am Main and Schöllkrippen is often used for “Historic Steam Locomotive Journeys”.

The Kahltal-Spessart cycling-hiking trail starts at Kahl.

Infrastructure

Transport 
Kahl am Main lies in a favourable location with regards to transport between Aschaffenburg and Hanau with good transport links to Autobahn A 45 (Gießen - Aschaffenburg) as well as Autobahn A 3 (Frankfurt am Main - Würzburg - Nuremberg - Munich). Bundesstraßen 8 (Aschaffenburg - Hanau), 43 and 43A link Kahl am Main to the Frankfurt Rhine Main Region.

The Main–Spessart railway from Frankfurt to Würzburg, where it connects to Nuremberg and Munich, runs through the Kahl am Main station, which is served by Regional-Express services. Here the Kahlgrundbahn (to Schöllkrippen) branches off. Kahl has no goods station. The nearest ones are in Hanau and Aschaffenburg.

The nearest airport is Frankfurt Airport.

Utilities

Nuclear power station 
Despite the name, the first nuclear reactor in Germany, the Versuchsatomkraftwerk Kahl ("Kahl Experimental Nuclear Power Station") was not built in Kahl am Main but in the neighbouring municipality of Großwelzheim (now part of Karlstein am Main). There were three reasons the plant was not named after Großwelzheim:
Kahl was easier to pronounce for the U.S. personnel;
Kahl had a railway station; Großwelzheim did not;
the plant got its mail from the Kahl Post Office.

The power plant was shut down in 1985 and the reactors have been dismantled.

References

External links 

 Community’s official webpage 
Catholic church in Kahl 

Aschaffenburg (district)